Franz San Galli (Franz Karlovich San Galli; 10 March 1824 – 30 July 1908) was a prominent Russian public figure, entrepreneur and inventor. In 1882 San Galli was granted a status of a purveyor to the Russian Imperial Court and a right to apply the Imperial Coat of Arms to his products in recognition of their exceptional quality.

Due to his personal and business achievements he went through the ranks from second to first guilde merchant. In 1889 he was promoted to the rank of Actual Civil Councilor (4th in line from the top of the list of state ranks). A year earlier, in 1888, he also received a title of an honorary engineer-technologist.

Biography
San Galli was born either in Stettin or Kammin (where his father Carl Sangalli, a royal tax officer worked), in Prussian Pomerania. He was mostly of Italian and German descent. He spent most of his life in St. Petersburg (Russia's capital at the time), where he ran his business and developed his inventions.

He entered into professional activities as a trained at a wholesale company that traded in Russian goods. At age of 19 he departed from Stettin for St. Petersburg. Later he proudly remembered in his memoirs that embarking on a journey he was provided only with 100 thalers and a mother's blessing.

San Galli started his own business in 1853 in St. Petersburg as a small mechanical workshop at 46 Ligovsky Kanal with 12 employees and a commercial outlet at 60 Nevsky Prospect. Quite soon he was joined by his brother Robert who permanently resided in Russia and helped him running ever growing business.

As a businessman he did pay special attention to gaining reputation as well as increasing his competitiveness. His personal motto in German read "Ohne Hast, ohne Rast" ("Without haste, without rest").

San Galli constantly took part in exhibitions and industrial fair contests. Even at early stage of his career he did have a diverse productive capacity and trade to pursue new business opportunities. In 1861 at one of his first exhibitions he displayed his products in 22 categories.

A major breakthrough in business came a few years later when San Galli received a contract for renovation of heating system in the Imperial greenhouses in Tsarskoye Selo.

He is credited as one of the inventors of the radiator, which significantly contributed to modern central heating systems. He gave it the name "hot-box".

San Galli's claim as the inventor of the heating radiator is disputed. It appears that he is one of several people who contributed to the development of the heating innovation. San Galli received a radiator patent in 1857, while American Joseph Nason developed a primitive radiator in 1841 and received a number of U.S. patents for hot water and steam heating. Nason's patent for tapered pipe threads in particular is cited by 1930s writer Ara Marcus Daniels as the key development in the birth of the radiator.

San Galli died in St. Petersburg.

References

External links
 

1824 births
1908 deaths
Russian inventors